Bir Tam Tam is a commune in Sefrou Province of the Fès-Meknès administrative region of Morocco. At the time of the 2004 census, the commune had a total population of 9714 people living in 1818 households.

References

Populated places in Sefrou Province
Rural communes of Fès-Meknès